The Democratic Society Congress is a pro-Kurdish NGO favouring the implementation of Democratic Confederalism  in Turkish politics. Its foundation congress was held between 26-29 October 2007.

Structure 
It has 2 co-chairs, a chairman and a chairwoman, a general assembly with 501 delegates, an executive council of 21 members and several committees. 40% of the delegates of the general assembly are represented by labour unions, civil society organizations and political parties, 40% are representatives from local assemblies. The congress meets approximately every 3 months to discuss the resolutions which come from the distinct committees. The DTK has assemblies in several administrative subdivisions like in districts, cities, villages and neighborhoods. For each street in a neighborhood, there should exist a commune. These are then followed by assemblies in their respective neighborhood, town, city or region. Each commune is independent in their decision making process but is still in a relationship with their respective neighborhood council which coordinates the decisions in the different communes. The DTK has an executive committee of 5 members, a coordination council with 13 members and a permanent assembly of 101 delegates. Several committees are formed by the DTK.

 Economy commission
 Women's commission
 Ecology and Local Government commission
 Youth commission
 Faith commission
Health
 Diplomacy commission
 Status and Law commission
 Art and Cultural commission
 Science commission
Human Rights commission
Political Affairs Commission

Ideology 

On 14 July 2011 it announced its support for Democratic Autonomy after having held an extraordinary congress in Diyarbakır with 850 participants. The DTK is also active in the solution finding process for the Kurdish-Turkish conflict in Turkey and issued a proposal for a political solution in December 2015. According to this proposal it was supported the idea of issuing a new constitution after which Turkey would be structured into several democratic autonomous regions represented in the Grand National Assembly of Turkey.

Prosecution of sympathizers and members 
Its members are often prosecuted by the Turkish authorities, and the attendance of events organized by the DTK can be viewed as a reason of prosecution as was the case for Evrensel writer Yusuf Karataş. Also the attendance of a DTK congress as annon member can be viewed as a reason for prosecution has stated the DTK. Numerous raids were conducted at the delegates houses that were on the list which was confiscated during a search in October 2018. Also, Leyla Güven, received a demand to resign from the post of co-chair of the DTK by the Turkish authorities. Despite the legal existence of the DTK, a membership in the DTK was deemed as an evidence of being a member in a criminal organization in the indictment of the closure case of the pro-Kurdish HDP.

Leaders

References 

Kurdish organisations